Yi Bong-chool or Lee Bong-chool (1925–1992) was an officer for the Republic of Korea.

Background
Yi Bong-chol was born in 1925 in Haman County, South Gyeongsang Province. He was in the landings of Inchon and Tong young during the Korean War.

He commanded the 2nd Marine Brigade in South Vietnam from October 1967.

Family
Married to Ku Boo-ja, and father of two children.

References

20th-century South Korean businesspeople
Korean generals
1992 deaths
1925 births
People from Haman County